Godod, officially the Municipality of Godod (Subanen: Benwa Godod; Chavacano: Municipalidad de Godod), is a 4th class municipality in the province of Zamboanga del Norte, Philippines. According to the 2020 census, it has a population of 17,510 people.

Geography

Barangays
Godod is politically subdivided into 17 barangays.

Climate

Demographics

Economy

References

External links
 Godod Profile at PhilAtlas.com
 [ Philippine Standard Geographic Code]
Philippine Census Information

Municipalities of Zamboanga del Norte